Rajab al-Hafiz al-Bursi (d 1411) an Arab Shia theologian and mystic.

Rajab al-Hafiz al-Bursi was born in contemporary Iraq, near Hilla,  and moved to the Iranian province of Khurasan to escape accusations of heresy.  Some sources indicate that he might have been murdered by the Timurids during the Shia persecutions.

His main work is the Mashariq al-anwar al-yaqin fi asrar amir al-muminin (The Orients of the Lights of Certainty concerning the Arcana of the Commander of the Faithful), a work of High Imamology commenting on the apocryphal theopathic sayings attributed to Ali - viz. the Sermon Between the Two Gulfs (khutba tantanjiyya) and the Sermon of the Elucidation (khutbatu'l-bayan).

Sources 

B. T Lawson ''The Light of Certainty in Heritage of Sufism'', Oxford, 1999 pp 225–244

Iraqi Sufis
Iraqi Shia Muslims
People from Hillah